Saalim Abdul Hakim (born February 1, 1990) is a former American football wide receiver. He was signed by the Dallas Cowboys as an undrafted free agent in 2012. He played college football at Palomar College and Tarleton State. He is the younger brother of former NFL wide receiver and punt returner Az-Zahir Hakim.

Amateur career
Hakim did not play organized football on any level until his senior year of high school. Hakim spent his first three years of high school at a Muslim school in Atlanta which did not have a football team. He then transferred to Palo Verde High School in Nevada. After graduating high school, he played college football at Palomar College in San Marcos, California before earning a scholarship to play for Cary Fowler at Tarleton State University in Stephenville, Texas. Hakim spent one season as a reserve at Tarleton State before leaving for the pros.

Professional career

Las Vegas Locomotives
He played the 2011 season with the Las Vegas Locomotives of the United Football League. He played four games in which he recorded 3 receptions, 81 receiving yards and one receiving touchdown.

Dallas Cowboys
On April 30, 2012, he signed with the Dallas Cowboys as an undrafted free agent. Hakim missed two weeks of training camp due to a finger injury and was released by the team before the start of the regular season.

St. Louis Rams
On November 7, 2012, he signed with the St. Louis Rams.

New Orleans Saints
On December 18, 2012, he was promoted from the practice squad to the active roster after the team placed strong safety Corey White on injured reserve due to a knee injury. On August 31, 2013, he was released.

New York Jets
On October 10, 2013, he signed with the New York Jets to join the practice squad. On December 13, 2013, Hakim was placed on the Jets active roster, after a season-ending injury to receiver Stephen Hill. 
On October 26, 2014, Hakim made a diving tackle on Buffalo Bills rookie receiver Sammy Watkins, who slowed down on his way to the endzone in celebration. Watkins was downed at the five after having gained 84-yards on the play.
On August 29, 2015 Hakim was one of twelve players to be cut by the New York Jets.

Detroit Lions
On September 8, 2015, Saalim was signed to the Detroit Lions' practice squad. On September 17, 2015, he was released from practice squad.

Kansas City Chiefs
On October 13, 2015, Saalim was signed to the Kansas City Chiefs' practice squad. On November 9, 2015, he was promoted to the active roster. On November 28, 2015, he was waived.

Cleveland Browns
Hakim signed with the Cleveland Browns on April 25, 2016. On May 2, 2016, he was released.

Personal life
His brother is former NFL wide receiver Az-Zahir Hakim, was selected in the fourth round, 96th overall pick by the St. Louis Rams in the 1998 NFL Draft. Hakim is a devout Muslim who prays five times daily.

References

External links
Palomar bio 
Tarleton bio 
St. Louis Rams bio 
New Orleans Saints bio 
New York Jets bio

African-American Muslims
American Muslims
1990 births
Living people
American football wide receivers
Palomar Comets football players
Tarleton State Texans football players
Las Vegas Locomotives players
Dallas Cowboys players
St. Louis Rams players
New Orleans Saints players
New York Jets players
Detroit Lions players
Kansas City Chiefs players
Cleveland Browns players
African-American players of American football
Players of American football from Atlanta
21st-century African-American sportspeople